Turritella variegata is a species of sea snail, a marine gastropod mollusk in the family Turritellidae.

Distribution

Description 
The maximum recorded shell length is 120 mm.

Habitat 
The minimum recorded depth for this species is 0 m; maximum recorded depth is 53 m.

References

External links

Turritellidae
Gastropods described in 1758
Taxa named by Carl Linnaeus